Juli Ellyn Briskman ( Klyce; born March 16, 1967) is an American politician, marketing analyst, and journalist. She is a supervisor for the Algonkian District of Loudoun County, Virginia. Briskman garnered international attention for flipping off then-President Donald Trump in Sterling, Virginia, as he returned from a golfing trip in 2017. She once again received international attention when she was elected to the Loudoun County Board of Supervisors in 2019.

Early life 
Briskman is originally from the Columbus, Ohio, metropolitan area and graduated from Worthington High School, where she was a field hockey athlete, in 1985. She graduated from The Ohio State University in 1990, with a degree in journalism. She worked for the school newspaper, The Lantern. She received an MBA in marketing from Johns Hopkins University's Carey Business School in 1998.

Career 
Briskman interned for the Kuwait Times, where she made news for escaping to Saudi Arabia as the Iraqis invaded Kuwait. She worked at the U.S. Department of State as a community liaison officer for eight years, including embassies in Riga, Latvia and Almaty, Kazakhstan. After working at the State Department, she was in the admissions and marketing departments at Village Green Day School. She was a marketing analyst at several companies until the beginning of 2019, including as chief marketing officer of a health-care company in Chantilly, Virginia. She received a certificate in digital marketing from Georgetown University in 2017.

Middle finger controversy 
On October 28, 2017, Briskman was riding her bike in Sterling, Virginia, when the Trump motorcade passed her as he departed Trump National Golf Club Washington, D.C. She flipped her middle finger as Trump rode by, which was caught on camera by a photographer. Briskman had worked as a marketing analyst for Akima, a government contractor, for eight months until she was fired for using the viral photo as her Facebook cover photo and her Twitter profile picture. She sued for wrongful termination as another employee also had "obscene content", which it was her job to flag, on his social media accounts, but was allowed to remove it. Her claim was not upheld in court because Virginia's at-will employment laws do not cover free speech, but the judge granted Briskman the full severance pay she was owed.

2019 election 
In 2019, Briskman, a Democrat,  was elected to the Algonkian District seat of the Loudoun County Board of Supervisors, defeating eight-year incumbent Suzanne M. Volpe. She described herself as running on policies such as environmentalism, education, and women's rights, rather than the notice she received for flipping off the president. The Washington Post described her victory as "fabulous revenge", and Gerard Baker of London's The Times noted that it highlighted President Trump's perceived issues with suburban American women.

Personal life 
Briskman moved to Loudoun County in the early 2000s. She is the mother of two with her ex-husband. Briskman has also worked part-time as a yoga instructor.

References

External links 
 
 

1967 births
Living people
21st-century American journalists
21st-century American women politicians
21st-century American politicians
21st-century American women writers
American marketing people
American women journalists
American yoga teachers
County supervisors in Virginia
Johns Hopkins Carey Business School alumni
Journalists from Ohio
Journalists from Virginia
Marketing women
Ohio State University School of Communication alumni
People from Columbus, Ohio
People from Sterling, Virginia
People from Worthington, Ohio
Politicians from Columbus, Ohio
Protests against Donald Trump
United States Department of State officials
Virginia Democrats
Women in Virginia politics
Writers from Columbus, Ohio